Arthur Owen Blessitt (born October 27, 1940) is a traveling Christian preacher who is known for carrying a cross through every nation of the world.

Biography

Early life and career
Blessitt was born in Greenville, Mississippi, and grew up in northeast Louisiana, where his father managed a large cotton farm. At the age of seven, Blessitt became a Christian. He studied at Mississippi College and Golden Gate Baptist Seminary, but abandoned his studies to serve as a pastor in several Baptist churches across the US.

In the late 1960s, Blessitt began preaching in Hollywood, California. There he became known as the "Minister of Sunset Strip". In March 1968, he opened a coffee house called His Place in a rented building next door to a topless go-go club.

His first marriage was to Sherry Anne Simmons, whom he married within three weeks of dating in 1963. Together they had six children: Gina, Arthur Joel, Joy, Arthur Joshua, Arthur Joseph and Arthur Jerusalem. Blessitt and Simmons divorced in 1990.

He married Denise Irja Brown later in 1990. Together, they adopted a child, Sophia, and now live in Denver, Colorado.

Cross walk
Arthur Blessitt made the cross in 1968 to hang on the wall of "His Place" on Sunset Strip, Hollywood, and made short cross walks in that area. On December 25, 1969, he began his journey with the cross, walking from Los Angeles to Washington, D.C. Speaking of his inspiration for the walks, he said he "heard the voice of Jesus calling him to walk to every nation." For a short while, from 1970 to 1971, he set up an evangelical outreach at New York's Times Square, which was similar to his Hollywood coffeehouse. In May 1971, Blessitt made his first overseas cross-walk, beginning in Northern Ireland.

Blessitt has carried the cross to all parts of the world. During the Cold War, he carried his cross into the Soviet Union, through Russia, the Baltic States, Ukraine and other countries. He has carried the cross through such places as Iraq, North Korea, Iran, Afghanistan, Somalia, Sudan, China, South Africa, Lebanon, India, Antarctica, Palestine, Israel, Cuba, Libya, Northern and Southern Yemen, Vietnam and Mongolia.

Whilst traveling, Blessitt has met numerous world and religious leaders including, George W. Bush, Billy Graham, Pope John Paul II, Yasser Arafat and Muammar al-Gaddafi. He was arrested 24 times and lost his cross twice.

On part of a cross walk through Beirut, Blessitt chose to bring his son Arthur Joshua.

On June 13, 2008, Arthur Blessitt walked his 38,102nd mile (61,319th km) in Zanzibar, completing the goal he had set for himself to walk to every "country and island group" in the world.

As of July 2019, Blessitt still partakes in cross walks globally. Blessitt claims to have covered over 43,000 miles (69,202 km) through 324 "nations, island groups and territories". He also claims to have traveled every ocean and walked on all seven continents (including Antarctica). Trinity Broadcast Network's PR Newswire claims that he is known internationally as the "Pilgrim with the Cross". He is featured in the Guinness World Records 2015 for holding the record for Longest Around the World Ongoing Pilgrimage/Walk. 

Blessitt has been the subject of various documentaries, such as The Cross Museum of Arthur and Denise Blessitt (2014), Arthur: A Pilgrim (1988), and The Cross: The Arthur Blessitt Story (2009), directed by Matthew Crouch.

Religious views
Blessitt practices within the evangelical tradition of Protestant Christianity and sits within the Charismatic wing of that tradition. He lists R. T. Kendall and Charles Spurgeon as inspirations.

Politics
Blessitt made a failed bid for the 1976 Democratic nomination for President. He withdrew from the contest after contesting the New Hampshire and Florida primaries. He polled fifth in Florida with 8171 votes. He stated that he was "a happy loser" because "spiritual and moral reform has become a major campaign issue anyhow."

References

External links
 
 
 

1940 births
Living people
20th-century apocalypticists
20th-century evangelicals
21st-century evangelicals
American evangelists
American male non-fiction writers
Evangelical writers
Pedestrian circumnavigators of the globe
People from Greenville, Mississippi